Julius Bolivar Curtis (December 10, 1825 – June 10, 1907) was a lawyer and judge in Fairfield County, Connecticut, practicing for over fifty years. He was a member of the Connecticut Senate representing the 12th District from 1858 to 1859 and from 1860 to 1861.

He was born in Newtown, Connecticut on December 10, 1825, the son of Nichols and Ann Bennitt Curtis. He attended Newtown Academy, and the New York State and National Law School at Ballston Spa, New York. He was admitted to the bar on December 27, 1850. He began practicing law in Greenwich in 1851.

He was elected a Burgess of the Borough of Greenwich from 1855 to 1865, and served as Borough Attorney during the same period. During the American Civil War, he served on the Military Committee of the town of Greenwich.

He moved to Stamford in 1864. He was elected Judge of the Probate Court in 1867 for the district of Stamford, holding the post through 1870. He was judge of the Borough Court of Stamford from 1887 to 1893.

He was elected to the Connecticut Senate from Stamford. In this capacity, he was an ex officio member of the Corporation of Yale College.

Curtis had been a Republican since the organization of the party in Connecticut. However, he had previously sympathized with the Free Soil Party and the American Party.

He was a member of the General Council of the American Bar Association beginning in 1889, and from 1885 to 1889 served as one 
of its Vice-Presidents. He served as a director of the Stamford Street Railroad Company beginning in 1887.

Curtis married his first wife, Mary Acker on October 30, 1854. She died on February 23, 1884. They had two children: Louis J. Curtis and Sarah L. Mackey. His second wife was Alice Kneeland Grain. They married on May 11, 1886.

From 1896 to 1905, he was president of the Fairfield Bar Association.

He died in Stamford on June 10, 1907, of "old age."

References

1825 births
1907 deaths
Connecticut city council members
Connecticut Free Soilers
Connecticut Know Nothings
Connecticut lawyers
Connecticut state court judges
Republican Party Connecticut state senators
Municipal judges in the United States
People from Newtown, Connecticut
People from Greenwich, Connecticut
Politicians from Stamford, Connecticut
State and National Law School alumni
Toleration Party politicians
19th-century American judges